Enville may refer to:

 Enville, Staffordshire, England, a rural village
 Enville, Oklahoma, United States, a rural community
 Enville, Tennessee, United States, a town
 Enville, alternate name for Endville, Mississippi, an unincorporated community